"Riquet with the Tuft", also known as "Ricky of the Tuft", is a French literary fairy tale first published by Catherine Bernard in 1696. The more famous version is that of Charles Perrault in his Histoires ou contes du temps passé in 1697.

Name
Three possible explanations of the name Riquet exist:
 Perrault mischievously refers to the Riquetti family, whose name was Frenchified as Riquet. Pierre-Paul Riquet, protege of Jean-Baptiste Colbert, was the promoter of the Royal Canal in Languedoc.
 Catherine Bernard, author of an earlier version which inspired Perrault, was from Normandy. Émile Littré, in his article “Riquet à la Houppe”, specifies: “Etymology: it is said that in Norman, riquet means counterfeit, hunchback”.
 This nickname can also be interpreted as the diminutive of Henriquet, little Henri.

Plot
In the version by Charles Perrault, a fairy gives an ugly prince named Ricky the gift of conferring wit upon the one he loves the best. Prince Ricky of the Tuft comes to a kingdom with two princesses. The elder one is beautiful but unintelligent and the younger one is intelligent but ugly. The elder princess is saddened that her ugly but smart sister receives more attention than her. One day as the elder princess was going for a walk in the forest to ease her sorrow, she is approached by Ricky who had fallen in love with her after seeing portraits of her that circulated. Ricky asks how a person so beautiful as she can be so sad, to which she responds that she is sad because she is beautiful but lacks intelligence. Ricky then bestows the gift of intelligence on the elder princess for a promise of marriage. A year later, Ricky comes to marry her. She refuses on grounds that he cannot hold her to a promise made before she gained her wisdom. The princess then tells him that she was gifted at birth with the power to transform her lover into a beautiful person by the same fairy who helped him. The princess thinks of all the Prince's good qualities and at once the prince is transformed. The king has his daughter married to the prince who has already made preparations for the wedding.

References

External links

1697 short stories
French fairy tales
French literature
Works by Charles Perrault
Norman folklore